The name Kamo may refer to the following:

Places

Japan
(Note: kamo (鴨), is the common word for duck in Japanese, but the following names do not necessarily mean duck and are not necessarily written with that character.)

Kamo, Niigata
Kamo District, Gifu
Kamo District, Hiroshima
Kamo District, Shizuoka
Kamo, Kyoto
Kamo, Okayama
Kamo, Shimane
Kamo, Shizuoka
Kamō, Kagoshima
Kamo River in Kyoto
 A number of minor rivers listed under Kamogawa (disambiguation)
Kamo Shrine, which may mean Kamigamo shrine or Shimogamo shrine in Kyoto
 Kamo, a place name within Higashimiyoshi, Tokushima known for

Rest of the world
Gavar, Armenia - formerly Kamo
Kamo, Armenia
Kamo, Azerbaijan
Kamo, New Zealand, a town in the Northland Region of New Zealand
Kamo River (Russia)

People
 Kamo (Bolshevik) (1882–1922), real name of Simon Ter-Petrosian, Armenian-Georgian Bolshevik
 Kamo, nickname of former New Zealand sportsman Ian Jones (rugby union, born 1967)
 Kamo clan, surname of a Japanese clan 
 ,ancestral deity of the clan and Shinto deity of thunder
 Kamo no Chōmei (1155–1216), an author
 Kamo no Mabuchi (1697–1769), a poet
 Shu Kamo (born 1939), a football player and manager
 Kamo no Yasunori (917–977), an onmyōji
 first name (given name) of Serizawa Kamo (1826?–1863), commander of the Shinsengumi warriors
 Kamo (character), from the anime Doomed Megalopolis — the apprentice of Yasumasa Hirai
Kamo (character) from the videogame The Legend of Zelda: The Wind Waker

Cuisine
It may appear on menu items such as kamonanban (hot soba).
 kamo is one of Eggplant#Cultivars, of a large round shape; it is one of the better known "Kyoto vegetables" or Kyoyasai.

Other 
, Noh play featuring the deity.

See also 
Camo